The Teatro Fernán Gómez (previously Centro Cultural de la Villa de Madrid) is a theatre and cultural centre in Madrid, Spain.

History
Since its early days, its programme has featured plays by both classical and contemporary authors, as well as other events such as concerts and exhibitions.

In 2007, the theatre adopted the name of actor and author Fernando Fernán Gómez, who had died that year. In September 2013, the City Council of Madrid dismissed the director of the theatre and announced its intention to privatize its management, sparking outrage in the cultural world. The council eventually conceded.

Structure
The theatre has three rooms. The main one, Sala Guirau, has a capacity for 682 people. The secondary Sala Jardiel Poncela (also known simply as Sala Dos) can accommodate up to 175 people.

Other uses
The theatre has hosted funerals of celebrated artists on several occasions throughout the years, with those of Lola Flores (1995), Rocío Jurado (2006), and Tony Leblanc (2012) being notable examples.

References

External links

Culture in Madrid
Theatres in Madrid
Theatres in Spain
1977 establishments in Spain
Theatres completed in 1977
Buildings and structures in Recoletos neighborhood, Madrid
Entertainment venues in Madrid
Cultural centers in Spain